The 1912 Northern Illinois State Normal football team represented Northern Illinois State Normal College as an independent in the 1912 college football season. They were led by third-year head coach William Wirtz and played their home games at Glidden Field, located on the east end of campus. The team finished the season with a 3–5 record. William Baker was the team's captain.

Schedule

References

Northern Illinois State
Northern Illinois Huskies football seasons
Northern Illinois State Normal football